Wanyam or Wanham (Wañam, Huanyam) was a Chapacuran language of Rondônia, between the rivers São Miguel and Cautário. Abitana was a dialect.

Dialects
Dialects of Wanyam:
Cabishi (spurious)
Cujuna
Cumaná (Cutianá)
Matama (Matawa)
Urunamacan
Pawumwa (Abitana Wanyam)

Lévi-Strauss had also proposed a Huanyam linguistic stock consisting of Mataua Cujuna (Cuijana), Urunamakan, Cabishí, Cumaná, Abitana-Huanyam (from Snethlage's data), and Pawumwa (from Haseman's data).

References

Chapacuran languages